The Football Federation Islamic Republic of Iran (FFIRI) (Federâsion-è Futbâl-è Jomhuri-ye Eslâmi-ye Irân) is the governing body for football in Iran. It was founded in 1920, and has been a member of FIFA since 1948. It is also a member of the Asian Football Confederation. The FFIRI is responsible for organizing the Iran national team.

History

Suspension
On 23 November 2006, the federation was suspended by FIFA, due to government interference in football matters. FIFA rules decree that a national football federation should remain autonomous from the national government. However, on 17 December 2006, the ban was lifted and a new Transitory Board was composed of Mohsen Safaei Farahani as chairman, Kioumars Hashemi as deputy chairman and Mohammad Hassan Ansarifar, Hassan Ghaffari, Mohammad Khabiri and Ali Reghbati as members.

Controversies
The federation and Islamic government do not allow Iranian women into their stadiums.

During the 2009 Iranian election protests, seven members of the Iran national football team were initially reported to have been banned for life by the federation for wearing green armbands in support of the Iranian Green Movement.

Iran women's national football team was briefly banned by FIFA from international competition in 2011 for being forced by the federation to wear hijabs.

In 2015, Football Federation Islamic Republic of Iran banned players from the men's national team due to conscription problems.

In August 2017, the federation reportedly banned Masoud Shojaei and Ehsan Hajsafi from the national team after they played against Maccabi Tel Aviv in the UEFA Europa League.

On 9 November 2018 Fatma Samoura, Secretary General of International Federation of Football Association FIFA said she would ask Iranian government to end ban on women's entry to sport stadiums. On 7 August 2019, Mohammad Jafar Montazeri, prosecutor general of Iran, supporting the ban, said that it should not concern FIFA, if women in Iran can enter sports stadiums or not. However, after continuous pressure from FIFA, IRNA deputy Sports Minister Jamshid Taghizadeh said, women would be allowed to enter Azadi Stadium to watch the men's World Cup 2022 qualifier match between Iran and Cambodia in October.

Competitions

Men's
Persian Gulf Pro League
Azadegan League
League 2 (Iran)
League 3 (Iran)
Hazfi Cup
Iranian Super Cup

Women's
Kowsar Women Football League

Membership

Presidents

Board members
reference

National teams
 Iran national football team
Head coach: TBD
 Iran national under-23 football team
Head coach: TBD
 Iran national under-20 football team
Head coach: Samad Marfavi
 Iran national under-17 football team
Head coach: Hossein Abdi
 Iran national under-15 football team
Head coach: Vahid Amiri
 Iran national futsal team
Head coach: Vahid Shamsaei
 Iran national under-20 futsal team
Head coach: Ali Sanei
 Iran national beach soccer team
Head coach: Abbass Hashempour
 Iran women's national football team
Head coach: Maryam Irandoost
 Iran women's national under-23 football team
Head coach: Maryam Azmoon
 Iran women's national under-20 football team
Head coach: Maryam Azmoon
 Iran women's national under-17 football team
Head coach: Shadi Mahini
 Iran women's national futsal team
Head coach: Shahnaz Yari

References

External links
Official Website of IR Iran Football Federation at archive.org
Official Website of IR Iran Football Federation 
FIFA website
Iran at AFC site

Football federation
Federation
Iran
Sports organizations established in 1920
1920 establishments in Iran